Ralstonia pickettii is a Gram-negative, rod-shaped, soil bacterium.

Ralstonia pickettii is a Betaproteobacteria species found in moist environments such as soils, rivers, and lakes. It has also been identified in biofilms in plastic water pipes. It is an oligotrophic organism, making it capable of surviving in areas with a very low concentration of nutrients. Several strains have shown an ability to survive in environments highly contaminated with metals.  The ability to persist in these harsh conditions makes R. pickettii a candidate for bioremediation.

Ralstonia pickettii and R. insidiosa are emerging pathogens in hospital settings. R. pickettii pathology does not follow an easy definition; although no fully healthy human has ever become ill from it, the bacterium has seriously affected humans with poor health. Several hospitals have reported outbreaks—in particular, patients with cystic fibrosis and Crohn's disease have been shown to be infected with R. picketti. Of the 55 reported cases of such infection, the majority are due to contaminated solutions such as water, saline, and sterile drugs. These solutions are usually contaminated when the product is manufactured, because R. pickettii has the ability to pass through 0.45 and 0.2 µm filters that are used to sterilize medicinal products. The majority of  R. pickettii and R. insidiosa isolates showed susceptibility to most of the antibiotics tested. The most effective were found to be the quinolones and sulfamethoxazole/trimethoprim. The two bacterial species can be difficult to tell apart.

References

External links
Type strain of Ralstonia pickettii at BacDive -  the Bacterial Diversity Metadatabase

Burkholderiaceae
Bacteria described in 1973